The Quiche of Death (1992) is the first Agatha Raisin mystery novel by Marion Chesney under her pseudonym M. C. Beaton.

Premise 
Agatha Raisin retires from her profitable position as a PR agent in London and moves to the Cotswolds, expecting a peaceful country life. She enters a local baking contest with a quiche she bought in London; not only does she not win, but her quiche kills one of the judges. Desperate to prove her innocence, Agatha begins investigating the crime herself.

References

External links 
 UK publisher Constable & Robinson

1992 British novels
British detective novels
British mystery novels
Agatha Raisin series
British novels adapted into films
St. Martin's Press books